Ruth Lewis (1946 – 20 July 2020) was a Roman Catholic nun of the religious congregation for women, the Franciscan Missionaries of Christ the King, living and working in Karachi, Pakistan.

Vocation
On 17 February 1969, she became along with Sr. Gertrude Lemmens and Sr. Margaret D'Costa, one of the first to join the staff of Darul Sukun, home for around 150 mentally and physically disabled people, mostly children and teenagers, founded by the sisters of the Franciscan Missionaries of Christ the King.

Since 2000, she has been in charge of the Darul Sukun. Sister Lewis was assisted by a team of five other nuns. Some of the residents like Cookie Lewis were so attached to the nun that she adopted her surname.

She depended on many people and institutions who helped her run a home of this size. She praised the people who come and supply groceries, clothes or whatever the sisters need for the institution. Volunteers from schools and other organisations also help feed the children and play with them. She was also assisted by volunteers from the Netherlands who stay to help for as much as three months. Without financial assistance from the Government, she relied on donations to run the institution.

She was particularly proud of four of the children who won medals in the Special Olympics held in the United States in 1998.

Her role included welcoming visitors like American singer Mary McBride and Amanda Claudwell, the US press attaché in Karachi, who visited on October 30, 2011.

She has been listed among the people in Imran Aslam's book on the men and women who shaped Karachi.

Making a wish
In January 2015, Make-A-Wish Foundation Pakistan granted the wish of Cookie Lewis from Darul Sukun, to be a teacher for a day. The President of Make-A-Wish Foundation  and the Director of Education were also present with Sister Lewis at a ceremony held for the occasion.

Recognition
On 18 January 2014, she received the Pride of Karachi Award, which aimed to recognize and honor those individuals who have worked selflessly and passionately for the betterment of society.

In 2018, she received the Hakim Mohammed Said Award for her work for humanity. The award was presented by Sindh Governor Muhammad Zubair.

Sister Ruth Lewis died due to complications from COVID-19 during the COVID-19 pandemic in Pakistan on 20 July 2020 in Karachi.

On 14 August 2020, President Arif Alvi announced the posthumous grant of the civil award Sitara-i-Imtiaz to Lewis for her Public Service.

References

Female Roman Catholic missionaries
Pakistani Roman Catholic missionaries
2020 deaths
Date of birth missing
Place of birth missing
Roman Catholic missionaries in Pakistan
People from Karachi
20th-century Pakistani Roman Catholic  nuns
21st-century Pakistani Roman Catholic nuns
Recipients of Sitara-i-Imtiaz
Deaths from the COVID-19 pandemic in Sindh
1946 births